Since the 2022 Russian invasion of Ukraine, Russian authorities and armed forces have committed multiple war crimes in the form of deliberate attacks against civilian targets, massacres of civilians, torture and rape of women and children, and indiscriminate attacks in densely populated areas.

The Russian military exposed the civilian population to unnecessary and disproportionate harm by using cluster munitions and by firing other explosive weapons with wide-area effects such as bombs, missiles, heavy artillery shells and multiple launch rockets. The result of the Russian forces' attacks has been damage and destruction to civilian buildings including houses, hospitals, schools, kindergartens, nuclear power plants, historic buildings, and churches. By February 2023, a year into the conflict, the attacks had resulted in the documented death of more than 8,000 civilians, though the real death toll is presumed to be higher, while approximately 5,000 missile strikes, 3,500 airstrikes and 1,000 drone strikes against Ukraine were recorded.

After the Russian withdrawal from areas north of Kyiv, overwhelming evidence of war crimes by Russian forces was discovered. In particular, in the town of Bucha, evidence emerged of a massacre of civilians perpetrated by Russian troops, including torture, mutilation, rape, looting and deliberate killings of civilians. the UN Human Rights Monitoring Mission in Ukraine (OHCHR) later documented the murder of at least 50 civilians – mostly men, but also women and children – in Bucha. More than 1,200 bodies of civilians were found in the Kyiv region after Russian forces withdrew, some of them summarily executed. There were reports of forced deportations of thousands of civilians, including children, to Russia, mainly from Russian-occupied Mariupol, as well as sexual violence, including cases of rape, sexual assault and gang rape, and deliberate killing of Ukrainian civilians by Russian forces.

In the first month of the invasion, the Monitoring Mission also documented possible cases of hostage-taking and arbitrary detentions, including abductions, torture and enforced disappearance, of journalists, activists, public officials, and civil servants in Russian-occupied territories. The mission also expressed concern about mistreatment of prisoners of war in the conflict, as prisoners of war held by both Ukrainian and Russian/separatist forces were repeatedly abused, exposed to public curiosity, and in some cases tortured and/or killed. The OHCHR also expressed concern on the use of human shields, forcefully conscripted soldiers and detention camps.

On 2 March, the Prosecutor of the International Criminal Court (ICC) opened a full investigation into past and present allegations of war crimes, crimes against humanity, or genocide committed in Ukraine by any person from 21 November 2013 onwards, set up an online method for people with evidence to initiate contact with investigators, and sent a team of investigators, lawyers, and other professionals to Ukraine to begin collecting evidence. Two other independent international agencies are also investigating violations of human rights and of international humanitarian law in the area: the International Commission of Inquiry on Ukraine, established by the United Nations Human Rights Council on 4 March 2022, and the UN Human Rights Monitoring Mission in Ukraine, deployed by Office of the United Nations High Commissioner for Human Rights. The latter started monitoring human rights violations by all parties in 2014 and employs nearly 60 UN human rights monitors. On 7 April 2022, the United Nations suspended Russia from the UN Human Rights Council. By late October, the Ukrainian Prosecutor's office had documented 39,347 alleged Russian war crimes, identified more than 600 suspects, and initiated proceedings against approximately 80 of them.

On 17 March 2023, the ICC issued arrest warrants against Vladimir Putin and Maria Alekseyevna Lvova-Belova over allegations of involvement in the war crime of child abductions during the invasion of Ukraine.

Indiscriminate attacks, attacks against civilian targets 

According to human rights organisations and to the UN Human Rights Monitoring Mission in Ukraine, the invasion of Ukraine was carried out through indiscriminate attacks and strikes on civilian objects such as houses, hospitals, schools and kindergartens.

On 25 February, Amnesty International stated that Russian forces had "shown a blatant disregard for civilian lives by using ballistic missiles and other explosive weapons with wide area effects in densely populated areas". In addition, Russia has falsely claimed to have only used precision-guided weapons. Amnesty International said on 25 February that the attacks on Vuhledar, Kharkiv and Uman, were likely to constitute war crimes. Ukrainian prime minister Denys Shmyhal said on 26 February that Russia was committing war crimes.

A 3 March statement by the Office of the United Nations High Commissioner for Human Rights said that the agency had recorded at least 1006 civilian casualties in the first week of the invasion, but that it believed that "the real figures are considerably higher."

The World Health Organization released a statement on 6 March saying that it had evidence that multiple health care centres in Ukraine had been attacked, and Director-General Tedros Adhanom Ghebreyesus noted that "attacks on healthcare facilities or workers breach medical neutrality and are violations of international humanitarian law."

On 24 March, Amnesty International accused Russia of having repeatedly violated international humanitarian law during the first month of the invasion by conducting indiscriminate attacks, including direct attacks on civilian targets. According to Amnesty International, verified reports and video footage demonstrated numerous strikes on hospitals and schools and the use of inaccurate explosive weapons and banned weapons such as cluster bombs.

On 5 July, UN High Commissioner for Human Rights Michelle Bachelet reported that most of the civilian casualties documented by her office had been caused by the Russian army's repeated use of explosive weapons in populated areas. Bachelet said that the heavy civilian toll from the use of such indiscriminate weapons and tactics had by now become "indisputable".

Use of cluster munitions 

Reports on the use of cluster munitions have raised concerns about the heavy toll of immediate civilian casualties and the long-lasting danger of unexploded ordnance. Neither the Russian Federation nor Ukraine ratified the 2008 Convention on Cluster Munitions, but the use of cluster munitions in populated areas may already be deemed incompatible with principles of international humanitarian law prohibiting indiscriminate and disproportionate attacks. According to the Office of the United Nations High Commissioner for Human Rights, weapons equipped with cluster munitions have been used both by Russian armed forces and pro-Russian separatists, as well as to a lesser degree by Ukrainian armed forces.

On 19 June, The New York Times reported it had reviewed over 1000 photographs of potentially outlawed munitions. It identified photographic evidence of the widespread use of cluster munitions in a wide spectrum of civilian areas. It noted that most were unguided missiles, which have the propensity to cause collateral damage to civilians. It also found cases of other types of weapons whose use might be against international law, such as land mines.

Nuclear power plants 

At 11:28 pm local time on 3 March 2022, a column of 10 Russian armored vehicles and two tanks cautiously approached the Zaporizhzhia Nuclear Power Plant, Europe's largest. The action commenced at 12:48am on 4 March when Ukraine forces fired anti-tank missiles and Russian forces responded with a variety of weapons, including rocket-propelled grenades. During approximately two hours of heavy fighting a fire broke out in a training facility outside the main complex, which was extinguished by 6:20am, though other sections surrounding the plant sustained damage. That evening, the Kyiv US Embassy described the Russian attack on the Zaporizhzhia nuclear power plant as a war crime, though the US State Department quickly retracted this claim with the circumstances of the attack being studied and the Pentagon declining to describe the attack as a war crime. 

Ukrainian President Volodymyr Zelenskyy accused Russian President Vladimir Putin of committing "nuclear terror" by ordering the attack on the plant and Ukraine regulatory authorities stated that Russian forces fired artillery shells at the plant, setting fire to the training facility. The Russian Ambassador to the UN responded that Russian forces were fired upon by Ukrainian "saboteurs" from the training facility, which they set fire to when they left. Later on 4 March, the Director General of the International Atomic Energy Agency confirmed that the plant's safety systems had not been affected and there had been no release of radioactive materials, however, he was "... gravely concerned about the situation at Ukraine's largest nuclear power plant. The main priority was to ensure the safety and security of the plant, its power supply and the people who operate it".

Attacks on nuclear power facilities are mainly governed by Article 56 of Additional Protocol I to the Geneva Conventions, which generally prohibits attacks against civilian nuclear power plants. According to international scholars: "if it is established that Russian forces engaged in the shelling of the Zaporizhzhia plant or objectives in its vicinity in a way that risked a radioactive leak, it is almost certain that this operation violated Article 56" but it is "less likely" that Russian forces have committed a war crime in this case.

On 13 April, a report of the OSCE Moscow Mechanism's mission of experts concluded that Russian forces "did not attack buildings that could have released dangerous forces if damaged. They attacked and damaged, however, nearby buildings by attacks that could have affected those able to release radioactivity."

Cultural properties 

The use of explosive weapons with wide-area effects has raised concerns about the proximity of historic monuments, works of art, churches and other cultural properties. Russian forces damaged or destroyed the Kuindzhi Art Museum in Mariupol, the Soviet-era Shchors cinema and a Gothic revival library in Chernihiv, the Babyn Yar Holocaust memorial complex in Kyiv, the Soviet-era Slovo building and the regional state administration building in Kharkiv, a 19th-century wooden church in Viazivka, Zhytomyr Region, and the Historical and Local History Museum in Ivankiv. On 24 June, UNESCO stated that at least 150 Ukrainian historical sites, religious buildings, and museums were confirmed to have sustained damage during the Russian invasion.

Cultural property enjoys special protection under international humanitarian law. Protocol I of the Geneva Convention and the Hague Convention for the Protection of Cultural Property in the Event of Armed Conflict (both binding on Ukraine and Russia) prohibits state parties from targeting historic monuments in support of a military effort and from making them the objects of acts of hostility or reprisals. Protocol II of the Hague Convention allows attacks on a cultural property only in case of "imperative military necessity" provided that there is no feasible alternative. While Protocol II does not apply as such, as only Ukraine is a party and it applies only between parties, the provision on imperative military necessity may be applicable if it is interpreted as informing the convention, rather than adding to it. Attacks against cultural heritage amount to war crimes and can be prosecuted before the International Criminal Court.

Hospitals and medical care facilities 

As of 26 March, the UN Human Rights Monitoring Mission in Ukraine verified 74 attacks on medical facilities, 61 of them in Government-controlled territory (e.g. air strikes on hospitals in Izium, Mariupol, Ovruch, Volnovakha and Vuhledar), nine occurring in territory controlled by Russian affiliated armed groups, and four in contested settlements. Six perinatal centres, maternity hospitals, and ten children's hospitals had been hit, resulting in the complete destruction of two children's hospitals and one perinatal hospital. On 26 March, AP journalists in Ukraine claimed they had gathered sufficient evidence to demonstrate that Russia was deliberately targeting Ukrainian hospitals across the country.

On 30 March, the World Health Organization (WHO) reported that there had been 82 verified Russian attacks on medical care in Ukraine – including attacks on healthcare facilities, patients, and healthcare workers – since 24 February. WHO estimated at least 72 were killed and 43 injured in these attacks. By 8 April, WHO confirmed 91 attacks.

Energy infrastructure 

Since October 2022, Russia has increased the intensity of attacks on power stations and other civilian infrastructure in a campaign intended to demoralize the Ukrainian people and threatening to leave millions of civilians without heating or water during winter.  up to 40% of Ukraine's power grid has been attacked by Russia. The government has asked citizens to conserve energy, and rolling blackouts have been introduced.

The World Health Organization has warned of a potential humanitarian crisis, saying that "lack of access to fuel or electricity due to damaged infrastructure could become a matter of life or death if people are unable to heat their homes." Denise Brown, the United Nations Resident Coordinator for Ukraine, said that the attacks could result in "a high risk of mortality during the winter months."

Ravina Shamdasani, a spokesperson for the Office of the United Nations High Commissioner for Human Rights, said that "attacks targeting civilians and objects indispensable to the survival of civilians are prohibited under international humanitarian law" and "amount to a war crime." The President of the European Commission Ursula von der Leyen and 11 members of NATO's eastern flank also called the attacks a war crime.

In his comprehensive analysis, Charles J. Dunlap jr., executive director of Duke Law School's Centre on Law, Ethics and National Security and former deputy judge advocate general of the U.S. Air Force, pointed to the view that “[e]lectric power stations are generally recognized to be of sufficient importance to a State’s capacity to meet its wartime needs of communication, transport, and industry so as usually to qualify as military objectives during armed conflicts”, furthermore that they have been a favourite target for almost a century, and that Ukraine did resort to similar tactics in 2015. 

Military structures, too, typically rely on the civilian electrical grid. Also, attacks on civilian enterprises may be justified due to the Ukraine's "sizeable domestic military-industrial complex" and due to energy exports (also in the form of electricity) being one of Ukraine's main revenue sources. The distinction between military and civilian targets is still relevant but does however not preclude attacks on dual-use (military and civilian) facilities if it is not "reasonably feasible to segregate [civilian portions] out from the overall strike" - as it may be the case with Ukraine's "thoroughly integrated" electrical grid. The blurring of citizen and combatant, e.g. by calling upon citizens to report enemy positions via government apps, further complicates the picture. 

Similarly, proportionality of military advantage and civilian harm must be maintained but may be seen as adequate in this case, with about 70 civilian deaths (as of his writing) vs. 40% of the national grid knocked out. When evaluating the consequences, harm to civilians is understood by the US DoD as "immediate or direct harms". On the other hand, taking into account "remote harms" like the possible starvation or freezing of Ukrainian citizens in the following weeks or months is disputed, esp. as large parts of the grid have been restored quickly so far and as the Ukraine, too, is obliged to protect its citizens from extreme cold, regardless of the actions of the attacker. Finally, while explicit terror attacks are prohibited under international law, the disaggregation of justified military advantages and a psychological impact upon civilians is often hardly feasible. The US view is that "attacks that are otherwise lawful are not rendered unlawful if they happen to result in diminished morale."

Ill-treatment, torture and willful killing of civilians

Mass killing and torture of civilians

Kyiv and Chernihiv regions 

Human Rights Watch cited reports that in Staryi Bykiv Russian forces rounded up at least six men and executed them on 27 February. The villagers' bodies were allowed to be buried on 7 March. The soldiers left on 31 March. The Guardian said that three or four additional executions had taken place and that the local school had been destroyed. Much of the property in Staryi Bykiv and Novyi Bykiv was damaged or destroyed.

On 28 February, five civilians attempting to defend their village's post office in Peremoha, Kyiv Oblast were summarily executed by Russian forces who had stopped in the town. The post office was later blown up to hide evidence of the killings.

On 7 March, a Ukrainian Territorial Defense Forces drone operating near the E40 highway outside Kyiv filmed Russian troops shooting a civilian who had his hands up. After Ukrainian forces recaptured the area four weeks later, a BBC news crew investigating the area found the bodies of the man and his wife close to their car, all of which had been burned. More dead bodies lined the highway, some of which also showed signs of burning. During the incident, a couple in that car was killed, and their son and an elder were released. The burning of bodies may have been an attempt by Russian troops to destroy evidence of what they had done. At least ten dead were found along the road, two of them wearing recognisable Ukrainian military uniforms. The drone footage was submitted to Ukrainian authorities and London's Metropolitan Police.

On 26 March 2022, Russia, repelled from Kyiv, progressively withdrew from the region to concentrate on Donbas. Borodianka's mayor said that as the Russian convoy had moved through the town, Russian soldiers had fired through every open window. The retreating Russian troops also placed mines throughout the town, inhabitants later reported that Russian troops were deliberately targeting them and blocking rescue efforts during their occupation of the city.

On 15 April, Kyiv regional police force reported that 900 civilian bodies had been found in the region following the Russian withdrawal, with more than 350 in Bucha. According to the police most – almost 95% of them – were "simply executed". More bodies continued to be found in mass graves and under the rubble. As of 15 May, over 1,200 civilian bodies had been recovered in Kyiv region alone.

The Ukrainian Defense Ministry announced the discovery of 132 bodies in Makariv, accusing the Russian forces of having tortured and murdered them.

On 5 July, the OHCHR in Ukraine was working to corroborate over 300 allegations of deliberate killings of civilians by Russian armed forces.

Bucha 

After Russian forces withdrew from Bucha north of Kyiv, at the end of March, videos emerged showing at least nine apparently dead bodies lying in the street in the residential area of the town. Journalists who visited the area reported seeing at least twenty corpses in civilian clothing. On 1 April, AFP reported that at least twenty bodies of civilians lay in the streets of Bucha, with at least one the bodies having tied hands. The mayor of the city, Anatolu Fedoruk, said that these individuals had all been shot in the back of the head. Fedoruk also said that around 270 or 280 individuals from the city had to be buried in mass graves. In Vorzel, west of Bucha, Russian soldiers killed a woman and her 14-year-old child after throwing smoke grenades into the basement in which they were hiding. On 15 April, local police reported more than 350 bodies found in Bucha following the withdrawal of Russian forces and said most died of gunshot wounds.

Video footage from a drone verified by The New York Times showed two Russian armoured vehicles firing at a civilian walking with a bicycle. A separate video, filmed after the Russian withdrawal, showed a dead person wearing civilian clothing matching the drone footage, lying next to a bicycle. The Economist reported an account of a survivor of a mass execution. After getting trapped at a checkpoint when it came under fire from Russian artillery, the man was captured by Russian soldiers, along with the construction workers he was sheltering with at the checkpoint. The soldiers moved them to a nearby building being used as a Russian base, strip-searched them, beat and tortured them, then took them to the side of the building to shoot and kill them. The man was shot in the side, but survived by playing dead and later fleeing to a nearby home. BBC News also reported that bodies of civilians found in a local temple had their hands and legs tied and that some were also crushed by a tank.

Footage released by the Ukrainian Territorial Defense Forces appeared to show 18 mutilated bodies of murdered men, women and children in a summer camp basement in Zabuchchya, a village in the Bucha district. One of the Ukrainian soldiers interviewed stated there was evidence of torture: some had their ears cut off, others had teeth pulled out. The bodies had been removed a day before the interview and Corpses of other killed civilians were left in the road, according to him. A report by Radio Free Europe/Radio Liberty, an American state-funded media organization, described the basement as an "execution cellar" used by Russian forces.

According to residents of Bucha, upon entering the town, Russian tanks and military vehicles drove down the streets shooting randomly at house windows. The New York Times reported that during the Russian occupation snipers set up in high rise buildings and shot at anyone that moved. A witness told Radio Free Europe/Radio Liberty that the Russians "were killing people systematically. I personally heard how one sniper was boasting that he 'offed' two people he saw in apartment windows... There was no need. There was no military justification to kill. It was just torturing civilians. On other blocks, people were really tortured. They were found with their hands tied behind their backs and shot in the back of the head." Locals asserted the killings were deliberate and many reported that in several instances snipers would gun down civilians for no clear reason. HRW heard reports that civilians were fired upon when leaving their homes for food and water, and would be ordered back into their homes by Russian troops, despite a lack of basic necessities such as water and heat due to the destruction of local infrastructure, they also accused Russian troops of shooting indiscriminately at buildings and refusing medical aid to injured civilians.

According to a Kyiv resident who was present at the Bucha headquarters of the territorial defence force, Russian soldiers checked documents and killed those who had participated in the war in Donbas. He said that Russian troops killed people with tattoos associated with right-wing groups, but also those with tattoos of Ukrainian symbols. According to his account, in the last week of the occupation, Kadyrovite Chechen fighters were shooting at every civilian they encountered. Another resident reported that Russian soldiers checked the cell phones of civilians for evidence of "anti-Russian activity" before taking them away or shooting them.

On 5 April, Associated Press journalists saw charred bodies on a residential street near a playground in Bucha, including one with a bullet hole in the skull, and a burned body of a child. The journalists were unable to verify their identity or the circumstances that led to their death On the same date, The Washington Post reported that Ukrainian investigators found evidence of beheading, mutilation and incinerations of corpses found in the town. On the next day, they also reported that three other corpses, one beheaded, were found inside a glass factory, according to the investigators, the bodies of at least one of those killed were turned into a trap and mined with tripwires. On 21 April Human Rights Watch reported they had found "extensive evidence of summary executions, other unlawful killings, enforced disappearances, and torture" in Bucha. The human rights organisation documented the details of 16 apparently unlawful killings including nine summary executions and seven indiscriminate killings of civilians. On 27 April, Michelle Bachelet, Head of OHCHR, reported that the Monitoring Mission in Ukraine had documented the unlawful killing of 50 civilians – mostly men, but also women and children – in Bucha.

While Ukrainian officials called the situation "genocide", "a massacre" and "war crimes", Russia's Defense Ministry claimed that some of the footage was fake and accused Ukrainian troops of killing people by shelling the town. Numerous other countries demanded investigations and accountability, with UK prime minister Boris Johnson stating the footage in Bucha was "yet more evidence that Putin and his army are committing war crimes". Several nations such as the United Kingdom, Germany, France and Spain have called for the prosecution and punishment of Russia troops for reported atrocities in the invasion. On 4 April, US president Joe Biden called Putin "a war criminal". UK Prime Minister Boris Johnson said that the United Kingdom would use its resources to bring Putin to justice for atrocities being uncovered in Bucha.

Amnesty International stated that the killings near Bucha constituted "extrajudicial executions and other unlawful killings, which must be investigated as likely war crimes". Agnès Callamard, the Secretary General of Amnesty International, added that "Testimonies show that unarmed civilians in Ukraine are being killed in their homes and streets in acts of unspeakable cruelty and shocking brutality".

On 19 May, the New York Times released videos showing Russian soldiers leading away a group of civilians, then forcing them to the ground. The dead bodies of the men were later recorded by a drone on the spot where the video was recorded and the bodies were later found after Bucha's liberation. The videos clearly show the murdered men in Russian custody minutes before their execution and confirm eyewitness accounts. The troops responsible for the murders were Russian paratroopers.

On 8 August the local authorities completed the counting of victims and reported that 458 bodies had been recovered from the town, including 9 children under the age of 18; 419 people had been killed by weapons and 39 appeared to have died of natural causes, possibly related to the occupation.

Kharkiv region 

On 15 September 2022, after Russian forces were driven out of Izium in the Kharkiv counteroffensive, a large number of mostly unmarked graves was found in the woods close to the city. Amid the trees were hundreds of graves with simple wooden crosses, most of them marked only with numbers, whilst one of the larger graves bore a marker saying it contained the bodies of at least 17 Ukrainian soldiers. According to Ukrainian investigators, 447 bodies were discovered: 414 bodies of civilians (215 men, 194 women, 5 children), 22 servicemen, and 11 bodies whose gender had not yet been determined as of 23 September. While a minority of the casualties were caused by artillery fire and from lack of healthcare, most of the dead showed signs of violent death and 30 presented traces of torture and summary execution, including ropes around their necks, bound hands, broken limbs and genital amputation.

On Kupiansk, a family of three and their neighbour were reportedly shot and buried in a mass grave, the bodies were found by local law enforcement officers, according to them, Russian troops shot the civilians at close range in mid-September, the 4 dead bodies have bullet wounds in the chest and head, automatic weapon casings were also found during the inspection of a cellar not far from the site, on 6 October, local police found the bodies of two tortured men in a brick-making workshop in the city, one of the dead has a gunshot wound, criminal proceedings have been initiated on both cases (under Part 1 of Art. 438 (violation of the laws and customs of war) of the Criminal Code of Ukraine).

On 5 October, mass graves were also found on Lyman, Ukrainian troops and law enforcement officials found 110 trenches containing graves, some for children, at the Nova Maslyakivka cemetery, the bodies showed signs of "explosive and projectile injuries, as well as bullet injuries", 55 bodies of both civilians and soldiers were found on the trenches, among the dead was a family and their 1-year-old child, the youngest found in the graves. 34 bodies of Ukrainian soldiers were also found, in total, 144 bodies were found in the city, 108 of which in mass graves, among the dead, 85 were civilians. According to witnesses, Russian troops killed everyone who had collaborated with the Ukrainian military, and forced the locals to bury the bodies, they also said that many bodies were left for days on the street and that those that died by shelling were buried by family or neighbours, many bodies of dead Russian soldiers were also found in the city.

Trostianets 

After the town of Trostyanets in Sumy Oblast was retaken from Russian control, the local doctor at the morgue reported that at least one person in town was killed by Russians after being tortured, and young people were abducted. The town's hospital was also shelled; The New York Times said it was unclear who hit the building, but the locals accused the Russians.

Reporters from The Guardian visited the town after it was retaken from Russian troops and found evidence of executions, looting and torture carried out by Russian troops. According to the town's mayor, the Russians killed between 50 and 100 civilians while they occupied the town. One local witness stated that Russian soldiers fired into the air to frighten women delivering food to the elderly while shouting "Run bitches!".

Shooting at passing civilian vehicles 
According to Ukrainian regional authorities, at least 25 civilians, including six children, have been killed in attacks on cars trying to flee Chernihiv, or attacked in public places; one such incident, involving the killing of a 15-year-old boy on 9 March, was investigated by BBC and reported on 10 April. On 2 May Human Rights Watch documented three separate incidents involving the Russian forces opening fire on passing cars without any apparent effort to verify whether the occupants were civilians. The incidents took place in Kyiv and Chernihiv regions, involved four vehicles and killed six civilians and wounded three. Multiple witnesses' accounts and in loco investigations revealed that the attacks on civilians were likely deliberate and suggested that the Russian forces had also fired on other civilian cars in similar ways.

On 28 February, Russian forces shot at two vehicles that were trying to flee from Hostomel, northwest of Kyiv. On 3 March, in the same area, they opened fire on a vehicle with four men who were going to negotiate the delivery of humanitarian aid. In the village of Nova Basan, in the Chernihiv region, Russian soldiers shot at a civilian van carrying two men, injuring one of them; they pulled the second man from the van and summarily executed him, while the injured man escaped.

CCTV video also from 28 February shows that two civilians (a 72-year-old man and a 68-year-old woman) were killed when their car was blown apart by shots from a Russian BMP armoured infantry fighting vehicle at the intersection of the Bogdan Khmelnytsky Street and the Okruzhna Road, near the hospital in Makariv.

The Kyiv Independent reported that on 4 March Russian forces killed three unarmed Ukrainian civilians who had just delivered dog food to a dog shelter in Bucha. As they were approaching their house, a Russian armored vehicle opened fire on the car. In another incident, on 5 March at around 7:15 AM in Bucha, a pair of cars carrying two families trying to leave the town were spotted by Russian soldiers as the vehicles turned onto Chkalova Street. Russian forces in an armored vehicle opened fire on the convoy, killing a man in the second vehicle. The front car was hit by a burst of machine-gun fire, instantly killing two children and their mother.

On 27 March the Russian army shot at a convoy of cars carrying civilians fleeing the village of Stepanki, near Kharkiv. An elderly woman and a 13-year-old girl were killed. The incident was investigated both by the team on war crimes of the prosecutor's office in the Kharkiv region and by the Canadian news outlet Global News. The prosecutor's office said that on 26 March a Russian commander had given the order to fire rockets at civilian areas in order to create a sense of panic among the population. Global News presented what it saw as flaws in the official investigation.

On 18 April, during the capture of Kreminna, Russian forces were accused of shooting four civilians fleeing in their cars.

Kupiansk civilian convoy shooting 

On 30 September, a convoy of six civilian cars and a van on the outskirts of the village of Kurylivka (at that time in the so-called "gray zone" between Kupiansk and Svatove) was discovered by Ukrainian forces, with around 24 people killed, including a pregnant woman and 13 children. Ukraine accused Russian forces of being the perpetrators. Investigations suggested that the civilians were killed around 25 September. the bodies were apparently shot and burned out, according to 7 witnesses who managed to flee to the village of Kivsharivka, the convoy was ambushed by Russian forces on 25 September at around ~9:00 AM (UTC+3) while leaving for the village of Pishchane through the only available road at that time, after the attack, the Russian troops reportedly executed the remaining survivors. During the month, law enforcement officers identified all the victims of the convoy. 22 people managed to escape, 3 of those (including 2 children) injured. in the following days, 2 other bodies were found, with the final death toll being 26. Some of the physical evidence (the bodies of the victims and the car) was examined by French experts. They discovered signs of the use of 30 mm and 45 mm high-explosive shells, as well as VOG-17 and VOG-25 grenades.

Abduction and torture of civilians 

On 22 March the non-profit organization Reporters Without Borders reported that Russian forces had captured a Ukrainian fixer and interpreter for Radio France on 5 March as he headed home to a village in Central Ukraine. He was held captive for nine days and subjected to electric shocks, beatings with an iron bar and a mock execution. On 25 March Reporters Without Borders stated that Russian forces had threatened, kidnapped, detained and tortured several Ukrainian journalists in the occupied territories. Torture is prohibited by both Article 32 of the Fourth Geneva Convention and Article 2 of the United Nations Convention against Torture.

In April Human Rights Watch visited 17 villages in Kyiv Oblast and Chernihiv Oblast that had been under Russian occupation from late February through March 2022. The human rights organisation investigated 22 summary executions, 9 unlawful killings, 6 enforced disappearances, and 7 cases of torture. Witnesses reported that Russian soldiers beat detainees, used electric shocks, and carried out mock executions to coerce them to provide information. Twenty-one civilians described unlawful confinement in inhuman and degrading conditions.

On 4 April, Dementiy Bilyi, head of the Kherson regional department of the Committee of Voters of Ukraine, said that the Russian security forces were "beating, torturing, and kidnapping" civilians in the Kherson Oblast of Ukraine. He added that eyewitnesses had described "dozens" of arbitrary searches and detentions, resulting in an unknown amount of abducted persons. At least 400 residents had gone missing by 16 March, with the mayor and deputy mayor of the town of Skadovsk being abducted by armed men. A leaked letter described Russian plans to unleash a "great terror" to suppress protests occurring in Kherson, stating that people would "have to be taken from their homes in the middle of the night".

Russian soldiers were also accused of murders, tortures, and beatings of civilians in Borodianka during the withdrawal,

Ukrainians who escaped from occupied Kherson into Ukrainian-controlled territory provided testimonies of torture, abuse and kidnapping by Russian forces in the region. One person from Bilozerka in Kherson Oblast provided physical evidence of having been tortured by Russians and described beatings, electrocutions, mock executions, strangulations, threats to kill family members and other forms of torture.

An investigation by the BBC gathered evidence of torture, which in addition to beatings also included electrocution and burns on people's hands and feet. A doctor who treated victims of torture in the region reported: "Some of the worst were burn marks on genitals, a gunshot wound to the head of a girl who was raped, and burns from iron on a patient's back and stomach. The patient told me two wires from a car battery were attached to his groin and he was told to stand on a wet rag". In addition to the BBC, the Human Rights Watch UN Human Rights Monitoring Mission in Ukraine has reported on torture and "disappearances" carried out by Russian occupation forces in the region. One resident stated: "In Kherson, now people go missing all the time (...) there is a war going on, only this part is without bombs."

Kherson's elected Ukrainian mayor has compiled a list of more than 300 people who had been kidnapped by Russian forces as of 15 May 2022. According to The Times, in the building housing the Russian occupation authorities, the screams of the tortured could be frequently heard throughout the corridors.

On 22 July Human Rights Watch published a report documenting 42 cases of torture, unlawful detention and enforced disappearance of civilians in the Russian-occupied areas of Kherson and Zaporizhzhia regions. Witnesses described torture through prolonged beatings and electric shocks causing injuries including broken bones, broken teeth, severe burns, concussions, cuts and bruises. They also described being kept blindfolded and handcuffed for the entire duration of the detention, and being released only after having signed statements or recorded videos in which they pledge to cooperate or urge others to cooperate with the Russian forces. Ukrainian officials estimated that at least 600 people had been forcibly disappeared in the Kherson region since the Russian invasion.

Teachers in Russian-occupied areas were forced by the military to teach in the Russian language and were tortured for using Ukrainian.

Russian torture chambers

Kyiv region 
On 4 April, the Office of the Prosecutor General of Ukraine stated police in the Kyiv region found a "torture chamber" in the basement of a children's sanatorium in Bucha. The basement contained the bodies of five men with hands tied behind their backs. The announcement was accompanied by several photos posted on Facebook.

Sumy region 
In mid-April 2022 The Independent obtained two testimonies of survivors of a Russian torture chamber in Trostyanets, Sumy oblast. According to the witnesses, at least eight civilians were held in a basement of a train station, where they were tortured, starved, subject to mock executions, forced to sit in their own excrement, electrocuted, stripped, and threatened with rape and genital mutilation. At least one prisoner was beaten to death by Russian guards who told the prisoners "All Ukrainians must die". Two were still missing at the time of the report. One prisoner was given electric shocks to his head until he begged the Russian soldiers to kill him. Numerous bodies, mutilated to the point where they were unrecognizable, were discovered by investigators in the area around the town.

Kharkiv region 
After the successful 2022 Ukrainian Kharkiv counteroffensive which liberated a number of settlements and villages in the Kharkiv region from Russian occupation, authorities discovered torture chambers which had been used by Russian troops during their time in control of the area.

In the town of Balakliya, which the Russians occupied for six months, forensics specialists, human rights activists, criminal law experts, and Ukrainian investigators found extensive evidence of war crimes and torture. During the Russian occupation, the troops used a two-story building named "BalDruk" (after a former publishing company which had an office there before the war) as a prison and a torture center. The Russians also used the police station building across the street for torture. Ukrainian officials say that around 40 people were held in the torture chambers during the occupation and subject to various forms of violence, including electrocution, beatings and mutilation. Two torture chambers especifically for children were also found in the city, one of the kids who had been held there described being cut with a knife, burnt with heated metal and subjected to mock executions. 

Another Russian torture chamber was found in the liberated village of Kozacha Lopan, located at the local railway station. Ukrainian President Volodymyr Zelenskyy stated that more than ten torture chambers, along with mass graves, had been discovered in the Kharkiv areas liberated by Ukrainian troops. Zelenskyy also said: "As the occupiers fled they also dropped the torture devices". Kharkiv Regional Prosecutor's Office stated that "Representatives of the Russian Federation created a pseudo-law enforcement agency, in the basement of which a torture chamber was set up, where civilians were subjected to inhumane torture." Ukrainian prosecutors have opened investigations into Russia's use of torture chambers.

In Izium, journalists for the Associated Press found ten torture sites. An investigation found that both Ukrainian civilians and POWs were "routinely" subject to torture. At least eight men were killed while under torture.

Between late September and early October, Human Rights Watch interviewed over 100 residents of Izium. Almost all of them reported having family members or friends who had been tortured, and fifteen people said they had been tortured themselves; survivors described torture by administration of electric shocks, waterboarding, severe beatings, threats with firearms and being forced to hold stress positions for long periods. Residents stated that the Russians targeted specific individuals and that they already had lists of those locals who were in the military, the families of military people, or the people who were veterans of the war in Donbas. They also said that in selecting victims they would terrorize the townspeople by publicly strip searching them.

By October, no less than 10 torture sites had been identified in the town of approximately 46,000 inhabitants.

Zaporizhzhia region 
In July 2022, The Guardian reported on torture chambers in the Russian-occupied Zaporizhzhia region based on the testimony of a 16-year-old boy who was held in one of them, beginning in April. The boy was arrested by Russian soldiers while trying to leave the occupied city of Melitopol because he had a video on his phone from social media, which featured Russian soldiers expressing defeatist attitudes towards Russia's invasion. He was held in a make shift prison in Vasylivka. According to his testimony, he saw rooms where torture took place, as well as bloodstains and soaked bandages, and heard the screams of the people being tortured. The torture involved electric shocks and beatings and could last for several hours.

Kherson region 
After the liberation of Kherson by Ukrainian forces from Russian occupation, Ukraine's human rights ombudsman Dmytro Lubinets said that investigators had discovered Russian torture chambers established especially for children. According to local testimony revealed by Lubinets, the children were denied food and given water only every other day, were told their parents had abandoned them and forced to clean up the blood resulting from torture in adjacent torture cells for adults. Lubinets reported that a total of ten torture chambers were discovered by Ukrainian investigators in Kherson region, four of them in the city itself.

A Russian makeshift prison that functioned as an FSB torture chamber was discovered in the city, Ukrainian authorities estimated the number of people who had been imprisoned there at some point to be in the thousands. Among other instruments of torture, FSB officials used electric shocks against the victims.

Overt command to kill civilians 
Other than prima facie evidence and witness statements testifying to war crimes, evidence includes Ukrainian government intercepts of Russian military conversations, and Russian government contingency planning for mass graves of civilians.

Endangering civilians with placement of military objectives 
According to Human Rights Watch, both Russian and Ukrainian armies have based their forces in populated areas without first evacuating the residents, thus exposing them to unnecessary risks. On 29 June, also the Office of the United Nations High Commissioner for Human Rights expressed concern about Russian armed forces and pro-Russian armed groups as well as Ukrainian forces taking up positions close to civilian objects without taking measures for protecting the civilians. The human rights agency received reports of the use of human shields, which involves the deliberate use of civilians to render certain military objectives immune from attack.

Use of human shields 

ABC News and The Economist reported Russian soldiers using over 300 Ukrainian civilians as human shields in Yahidne from 3 to 31 March. Russian forces were using the village as a base to attack the nearby city of Chernihiv and had established a major military camp in the local school. For 28 days, 360 Ukrainian civilians, including 74 children and 5 persons with disabilities, were held captive in inhumane conditions in the basement of the school while the nearby areas were under attack by the Ukrainian forces. The basement was overcrowded, with no toilet facilities, water and ventilation. Ten elderly people died as a consequence of the poor detention conditions. Witness accounts report cases of torture and killings. According to the OHCHR what happened in the school of Yahidne suggests that the Russian armed forces were using civilians to render their base immune from military attacks while also subjecting them to inhuman and degrading treatment.

The BBC and The Guardian found "clear evidence" of the use of Ukrainian civilians as human shields by Russian troops in the area near Kyiv after the Russian withdrawal on 1 April, citing eyewitness accounts from inhabitants of Bucha and the nearby village of Ivankiv, and of residents of the village of Obukhovychi, near the Belarusian border, Russian troops were accused of using civilians as human shields as they came under attack by Ukrainian soldiers. Multiple witnesses reported that, on 14 March, the Russian soldiers went door-to-door, rounded about 150 civilians and locked them up in the local school, where they were used as protection for the Russian forces.

United States Secretary of State Antony Blinken has stated that Russia's use of nuclear power plants for active military operations as tantamount to the use of human shields, citing reports that Russian forces were firing on Ukrainians from nuclear sites.

Since the beginning of the invasion, Russia has repeatedly accused Ukraine of using human shields, a claim which has been rejected by scholars Michael N. Schmitt, Neve Gordon, and Nicola Perugini as an attempt to shift blame for civilian deaths to Ukraine.

Sexual violence 

According to experts and Ukrainian officials, there are indications that sexual violence was tolerated by the Russian command and used in a systematic way as a weapon of war. After the Russian withdrawal from areas north of Kyiv, there was a "mounting body of evidence" of rape, torture and summary killings by Russian forces inflicted upon Ukrainian civilians, including gang rapes committed at gunpoint and rapes committed in front of children.

In March 2022 the UN Human Rights Monitoring Mission in Ukraine stressed the heightened risks of sexual violence and the risk of under-reporting by victims in the country. At the beginning of June, the Monitoring Mission received reports of 124 episodes of conflict-related sexual violence committed against women, girls, men and boys in various Ukrainian cities and regions. The alleged perpetrators were from the ranks of Russian and pro-Russian separatist armed forces in 89 cases and from civilians or unidentified individuals in territory controlled by Russian armed forces in 2 cases.

In late March Ukraine's Prosecutor General opened an investigation into a case of a Russian soldier who was accused of killing an unarmed civilian and then repeatedly raping the dead man's wife. The incident allegedly took place on 9 March in Shevchenkove, a village outside of Kyiv. The wife related that two Russian soldiers raped her repeatedly after killing her husband and the family's dog while her four-year-old son hid in the house's boiler room. The account was first published by The Times of London. Russian spokesperson Dmitry Peskov dismissed the allegation as a lie. Ukrainian authorities have said that numerous reports of sexual assault and rape by Russian troops have emerged since the beginning of the invasion in February 2022. Ukrainian MP Maria Mezentseva said that these types of cases were underreported and that there are many other victims. Meduza published an in-depth account of the same case in Bogdanivka and of other events.

In another reported incident, a Russian soldier entered a school in the village of Mala Rohan where civilians were sheltering and raped a young Ukrainian woman. Human Rights Watch reported that the woman was threatened and repeatedly raped by a Russian soldier who cut her cheek, neck and hair. According to witness statements, the villagers informed Russian officers in charge of the occupation of the village of the incident, who arrested the perpetrator and told them that he would be summarily executed. Ukrainian Foreign Minister Dmytro Kuleba stated that Russian soldiers had committed "numerous" rapes against Ukrainian women. According to the Sexual Violence in Armed Conflict database, sexual violence by Russian forces has been reported in three of seven years of conflict since 2014 in eastern Ukraine.

A report published by The Kyiv Independent included a photo and information about one man and two or three naked women under a blanket whose bodies Russian soldiers tried to burn on the side of a road before fleeing. Ukrainian officials said the women had been raped and the bodies burnt. Human Rights Watch received reports of other incidents of rape in Chernihiv region and Mariupol. ABC News reported in April 2022 that "rapes, shootings and a senseless execution" have occurred in the village of Berestyanka near Kyiv, noting a specific incident where a man was reportedly shot by Russian soldiers on 9 March after attempting to block them from raping his wife and a female friend.

On 12 April 2022, BBC News interviewed a 50-year-old woman from a village 70 km west of Kyiv, who said that she was raped at gunpoint by a Chechen allied with the Russian Armed Forces. A 40-year-old woman was raped and killed by the same soldier, according to neighbours, leaving what BBC News described as a "disturbing crime scene". Police exhumed the 40-year-old's body the day after the visit by BBC News. A report by The New York Times related that a Ukrainian woman was kidnapped by Russian soldiers, kept in a cellar as a sex slave and then executed. On 3 June, the United Nations Special Representative on Sexual Violence in Conflict, Pramila Patten, told the U.N. Security Council that dozens of violent sexual attacks against women and girls have been reported to the U.N. human rights office, and many more cases likely have not been reported. She also said the country is turning into “a human trafficking crisis.”

As of 5 July, the UN Human Rights Monitoring Mission in Ukraine had verified 28 cases of conflict-related sexual violence, including rape, gang rape, torture, forced public stripping, and threats of sexual violence. OHCHR reported that 11 cases, including rape and gang rape, were committed by Russian armed forces and law enforcement. In addition, due to the limited communication, especially with areas under Russian or separatist control (such as Mariupol) and contested cities, a major barrier to verification of cases remain access, the exact number of sexual violence cases have been difficult to track or respond to in a timely manner. Reports of sexual violence have been reported to Ukrainian and international authorities, law enforcement officials and media personnel as Russian troops have withdrawn.

A 52-year-old woman was taken by Russian soldiers in occupied Izyum and repeatedly raped while her husband was beaten. She, along with her husband, was arrested on 1 July and was taken to a small shed which served as a torture room. The Russian soldiers put bags over their heads and threatened them, afterwards, they forcibly undressed her, groped her, and told her that they would send photos of the activity to her family members to humiliate her and them. The woman was then raped repeatedly by the commander of the unit for the next three days, while simultaneously the other Russian soldiers beat her husband in a nearby garage. The rapist would then describe the assault to the husband. She attempted suicide by hanging, but failed. Subsequently, the Russian soldiers tortured her with electric shocks and humiliated her. The Russian commander also obtained the woman's bank number and stole the funds out of her account. The woman and her husband were released on 10 July when they were dumped blindfolded by the Russians at a nearby gas station. They managed to escape to Ukrainian territory, and, after Izyum was liberated in September, returned home.

In late September 2022, a panel of investigators from the Independent International Commission of Inquiry on Ukraine released a statement which said that the commission has "documented cases in which children have been raped, tortured, and unlawfully confined." and labeled these as war crimes. The same report also referenced children being killed and injured by Russia's indiscriminate attacks as well as forced separation from family and kidnapping.

Deportations 
According to Ukrainian officials and two witnesses, Russian forces have forcefully deported thousands of residents from Ukraine to Russia during the Siege of Mariupol. On 24 March, the Ukrainian Ministry of Foreign Affairs claimed that the Russian army had forcibly deported about 6,000 Mariupol residents in order to use them as "hostages" and put more pressure on Ukraine. According to the Russian ministry of defense the residents of Mariupol had a "voluntary choice" whether to evacuate to the Ukrainian- or Russian-controlled territory and that by 20 March about 60,000 Mariupol residents were "evacuated to Russia". Human Rights Watch has not been able to verify these accounts.

The US embassy in Kyiv cited the Ukrainian foreign ministry as claiming that 2,389 Ukrainian children had been illegally removed from the self-proclaimed republics of Donetsk and Luhansk and taken to Russia.

On 24 March, Ukraine's human rights ombudsman said that over 402,000 Ukrainians had been forcefully taken to Russia, including around 84,000 children. Russian authorities said that more than 384,000 people, including over 80,000 children, had been evacuated to Russia from Ukraine and from the self-proclaimed republics of Donetsk and Luhansk.

Deportation of protected peoples such as civilians during war is prohibited by Article 49 of the Fourth Geneva Convention. On 7 June, Human Rights Watch specialist Tanya Lokshina emphasized this point, reiterating that that forcible deportation against people's will was itself a war crime, and called Russia to stop this practice. In addition, Human Rights Watch and Kharkiv Human Rights Protection Group reported cases where refugees were being intimidated and pressured to implicate Armed Forces of Ukraine personnel for war crimes during long interrogation sessions, including the Mariupol theatre airstrike.

Arbitrary detention, enforced disappearance and hostage taking 
The UN Human Rights Monitoring Mission in Ukraine confirmed that in the first month of the invasion they had documented the arbitrary detention in Russian occupied territories of 21 journalists and civil society activists, nine of whom had already reportedly been released. The Human Rights Monitoring Mission also verified the arrests and detention of 24 public officials and civil servants of local authorities, including three mayors, by Russian armed forces and affiliated armed groups of the self-proclaimed republics of Luhansk and Donetsk.

International humanitarian law allows the internment of civilians in armed conflict only when they individually pose a security threat, and all detained persons whose prisoners of war (PoW) status is in doubt must be treated as prisoners of war under the Geneva Convention until their status has been determined. Reports of missing civilians are rampant in villages to the west of Kyiv, as Russian troops have withdrawn in the area, with a large majority of them male. One woman in Makhariv told reporters she witnessed Russian soldiers force her son-in-law at gunpoint to drive away from their house with the troops and he has not been seen since. Another man disappeared in Shptky, while attempting to deliver petrol to a friend with only his burned out and bullet-ridden car found later by Ukrainian troops.

On 5 July, the Office of the United Nations High Commissioner for Human Rights documented 270 cases of arbitrary detention and enforced disappearance of civilians, eight of whom were found dead. The OHCHR informed the Human Rights Council that arbitrary detention of civilians had become "widespread" in territory controlled by Russian forces and affiliated armed groups. OHCHR also reported that since the beginning of the invasion the Security Service of Ukraine and National Police had arrested over one thousand pro-Russian supporters, and that 12 cases were likely to amount to enforced disappearance by Ukrainian law enforcement bodies.

As of 15 May 62 victims (44 men and 18 women) of enforced disappearance had been released by Russian and Russian-affiliated armed groups. On most occasions the victims were released during "exchanges of prisoners" between Russia and Ukraine. According to the OHCHR, such exchanges might constitute cases of hostage taking, which in armed conflict amounts to a war crime, if the liberation of detained civilians had been made conditional by the Russian forces on the release by Ukraine of Russian prisoners of war.

Forced conscription 
At the end of February, Ukrainian civilians were reportedly forced to join the pro-Russian separatist forces in the self-proclaimed Luhansk and Donetsk people's republics. The Office of the United Nations High Commissioner for Human Rights documented cases of people forcefully taken to assembly points where they were recruited and immediately sent to the front line. They were men working in the public sector, including schools, and also people stopped on the street by representatives of local "commissariats". As recalled by the OHCHR, compelling civilians to serve in armed groups affiliated with a hostile power may constitute a serious breach of the laws and customs of international humanitarian law, and it constitutes a war crime under Article 8 of the Rome Statute of the ICC. The OHCHR also expressed concern about the case of some forced conscripts who have been prosecuted by Ukrainian authorities notwithstanding their combatant immunity under the law of armed conflict.

Filtration camps 

Evacuees from Mariupol raised concerns about the treatment of evacuees from Mariupol by Russian troops through a Russian filtration camp, that is reportedly used to house civilians before they were evacuated. Similar camps have been compared by Ukrainian officials to "modern-day concentration camps". Refugees have reported torture and killings when being processed through filtration camps, especially in Mariupol. These include beatings, electrocution and suffocating people with plastic bags over their heads.

The refugees were fingerprinted, photographed from all sides, and had their phones searched, and anyone believed to be a "Ukrainian Nazi" was taken to Donetsk for interrogation. They also told reporters there was a lack of basic necessities and a majority of the evacuations forced refugees into Russia.

On 5 July the OHCHR expressed concern about the whereabouts and treatment of those who had not passed the filtration process, who were possibly detained in unknown locations at high risk of being subjected to torture and ill-treatment.

Abduction of Ukrainian children 

According to Ukrainian authorities, Russian forces have also kidnapped more than 121,000 Ukrainian children and deported them to Russia's eastern provinces. The parents of some of these children were killed by the Russian military. The Russian state Duma has drafted a law which would formalize the "adoption" of these children. The Ukrainian Ministry of Foreign Affairs stated that there was a "blatant threat of illegal adoption of Ukrainian children by Russian citizens without observing all the necessary procedures determined by the legislation of Ukraine.” and called on United Nations bodies to intervene to have the children returned to Ukraine. 

On 1 June 2022, Ukrainian President Zelenskyy accused Russia of forcibly deporting more than 200,000 children from Ukraine, including orphans and children separated from their family. According to Zelenskyy, this amounts to a "heinous war crime" and a "criminal policy," whose object "is not just to steal people but to make deportees forget about Ukraine and not be able to return."

Treatment of prisoners of war 

As of November 2022, the UN Human Rights Monitoring Mission in Ukraine (HRMMU) conducted 159 interviews with prisoners of war held by the Russian and Russian-affiliated forces, and 175 interviews with prisoners of war held by Ukraine. The vast majority of Ukrainian prisoners reported that they had been held in dire conditions of internment and subjected to torture and ill-treatment, including beatings, threats, mock executions, electric and positional torture. Several women prisoners were threatened with sexual violence and subjected to degrading treatments and enforced nudity. The UN agency also collected information about nine possible cases of death during the "admission procedures" to the internment camps. According to HRMMU report, Russian prisoners of war made credible allegations of summary executions, torture and ill-treatment by members of the Ukrainian forces. In several cases Russian prisoners were stabbed and subjected to electric torture. Ukraine launched criminal investigations into allegations of mistreatment of prisoners of war.

Russian prisoners of war 

As of 31 July 2022, OHCHR documented 50 cases of torture and ill-treatment of prisoners of war in the power of Ukraine, including cases of beating, shooting, stabbing, positional and electric torture. One prisoner of war was reportedly suffocated by Ukrainian policemen of the  Kharkiv SBU during his interrogation.

Torture of Russian POWs in Mala Rohan 

According to a report by the UN High Commissioner for Human Rights (OHCHR), members of Ukrainian armed forces shot the legs of three captured Russian soldiers and tortured Russian soldiers who were wounded. The incident is likely to have occurred on the evening of 25 March in Mala Rohan, south-east of Kharkiv, in an area recently recaptured by Ukrainian troops, and was first reported following the publication on social media accounts of a video of unknown authorship between 27 and 28 March. One of the video's versions depicts a number of soldiers lying on the ground; many appear to be bleeding from leg wounds. Three prisoners are brought out of a vehicle and shot in the leg  by someone off-camera.

Alleged execution of captured Russian soldiers 
On 6 April a video allegedly showing Ukrainian troops of the Georgian Legion executing captured Russian soldiers was posted on Telegram. The video was verified by The New York Times and by Reuters. A wounded Russian soldier was seemingly shot twice by a Ukrainian soldier while lying on the ground. Three dead Russian soldiers, including one with a head wound and hands tied behind his back, were shown near the soldier. The video appeared to have been filmed on a road north of the village of Dmytrivka, seven miles south of Bucha. Ukrainian authorities promised an investigation.

Disputed surrender of Russian soldiers in Makiivka 

On 12 November, a video appeared on pro-Ukrainian websites showing the bodies of soldiers in Russian uniforms lying on the ground in a farmyard in the Makiivka area. On 17 November, more footage emerged, taken from the ground by a person at the scene. The video shows the Russian soldiers as they exit a building, surrender, and lay face down on the ground. Then another Russian soldier emerges from the same building and opens fire on the Ukrainian soldiers who are surprised. An aerial video from the site documents the aftermath, with at least 12 bodies of Russian soldiers, most positioned as they were when they surrendered, bleeding from gunshot wounds to the head.

The authenticity of the videos was verified by The New York Times. Russia and Ukraine accused each other of war crimes, with Russia accusing Ukraine of "mercilessly shooting unarmed Russian P.O.W.s," and Ukraine accusing the Russians of opening fire while surrendering. Ukraine's officials said the Prosecutor General’s office would investigate the video footage as the incident may qualify as a crime of  "perfidy" committed by the Russian troops in feigning surrender. On 25 November the UN High Commissioner for Human Rights Volker Türk said "Our Monitoring Mission in Ukraine has conducted a preliminary analysis indicating that these disturbing videos are highly likely to be authentic in what they show" and called on the Ukrainian authorities to investigate the allegations of summary executions of Russian prisoners of war "in a manner that is – and is seen to be – independent, impartial, thorough, transparent, prompt and effective."

Ukrainian prisoners of war 

As of 31 July 2022, OHCHR verified that, out of 35 interviewed, 27 Ukrainian prisoners of war had been subjected to torture by Russian and pro-Russian armed forces and policemen. Victims reported being punched, kicked, beaten with police batons and wooden hammers, electrocuted, threatened with execution or sexual violence, and shot in the legs. OHCHR had also received information about the deaths of two Ukrainian prisoners as a result of torture, one beaten and electrocuted on 9 May at the Melitopol airfield, the other beat to death at the Volnovakha penal colony near Olenivka, Donetsk region, on 17 April.

Execution of surrendering Ukrainian soldiers 
At an Arria-formula meeting of the UN Security Council, the US ambassador-at-large for global criminal justice Beth Van Schaack said that US authorities have evidence that surrendering Ukrainian soldiers were executed by the Russian army in Donetsk. A Ukrainian soldier who was shown among prisoners in a Russian video on 20 April, was confirmed dead days later.

Eyewitness accounts and a video filmed by a security camera provide evidence that on 4 March Russian paratroopers executed at least eight Ukrainian prisoners of war in Bucha. The victims were local inhabitants who had joined the defense forces shortly before they were killed.

Death sentence against foreign soldiers serving in the Ukrainian armed forces 
Following a trial by the Supreme Court of the Donetsk People's Republic, three foreign-born members of the Ukrainian armed forces, Aiden Aslin, Shaun Pinner, and Brahim Saadoun were declared mercenaries and sentenced to execution by firing squad. Aslin and Pinner, originally from England, had been serving in the Ukrainian military since 2018, while Saadoun had come in 2019 from Morocco to study in Kyiv, having enlisted in November 2021. The ruling was described as illegal because the defendants qualify as prisoners of war under the Geneva Conventions and have not been accused of committing any war crimes.

On 10 June the Office of the United Nations High Commissioner for Human Rights condemned the death sentences and the trial. A spokesperson of the organisation declared that "such trials against prisoners of war amount to a war crime," and highlighted that according to the chief command of Ukraine, all the defendants were part of the Ukrainian armed forces and therefore should not have been considered mercenaries. The OHCHR spokesperson also expressed concern about procedural fairness, stating that "since 2015, we have observed that the so-called judiciary within these self-contained republics has not complied with essential fair trial guarantees, such as public hearings, independence, impartiality of the courts and the right not to be compelled to testify."

The International Bar Association issued a statement saying "that any implementation of the ‘pronounced’ death penalty will be an obvious case of plain murder of Aiden Aslin, Shaun Pinner and Brahim Saaudun and deemed an international war crime. Any perpetrators (anyone engaged in the so-called DPR ‘court’ and anyone who conspired to execute this decision) will be regarded as war criminals", also pointing out that neither Russian nor Ukrainian law allows the death penalty.

On 12 June, Donetsk People's Republic leader Denis Pushilin reiterated that the separatists did not see the trio as prisoners of war, but rather as people who came to Ukraine to kill civilians for money, adding that he saw no reason to modify or mitigate the sentences. Russian State Duma Chairman Vyacheslav Volodin accused the trio of fascism, reiterating that they deserved the death penalty. He added that the Ukrainian armed forces were committing crimes against humanity and were being controlled by a neo-Nazi regime in Kyiv.

On 17 June, the European Court of Human Rights issued an emergency stay of Saadoun Brahim's execution. It stressed that Russia was still obliged to follow the court's rulings. Earlier in June, the Russian State Duma passed a law to end the jurisdiction of the court in Russia, but it had not yet been signed into law.

On 8 July the DPR lifted a moratorium on the death penalty. On 21 September five British citizens held by pro-Russian separatists were released, including those sentenced to death, and also the Moroccan citizen Saadoun Brahim was freed after a prisoner exchange between Ukraine and Russia.

Torture of captured Ukrainian soldiers 
On 22 July, Human Rights Watch documented the torture of three Ukrainian prisoners of war, members of the Territorial Defense Forces, and the death of two of them in the occupied areas of Kherson and Zaporizhzhia Oblasts.

Castration and murder of a Ukrainian POW in Pryvillia 

On 28 July, a video was posted on Russian social media which shows a Russian soldier castrating a Ukrainian prisoner of war, who is tied up and gagged, with a box cutter. On the next day, a continuation video was posted with possibly the same soldiers where they taped the POW's mouth with black tape, placed his head in front of his cut genitals, and shot him in the head. After that, the Russian soldiers started grabbing the POW's corpse with ropes connected to his legs.

On 5 August, the Bellingcat group reported that the videos were geolocated to the Pryvillia Sanatorium, located in Pryvillia, Luhansk Oblast, and interviewed the apparent perpetrator by telephone. A white car marked with a Z – a designation marking Russian military vehicles and a militarist symbol used in Russian propaganda – can also be seen in the video; the same car can also be seen in earlier, official videos released by Russian channels, of the Akhmat fighters at the Azot plant during the Russian capture of Severodonetsk. Pryvillia had been captured and occupied by Russians since early July. Bellingcat identified the soldiers involved, including the main perpetrator (an inhabitant of Tuva), who wore a distinctive wide brimmed black hat, as members of the Akhmat unit, a Chechen Kadyrovite paramilitary formation fighting for the Russians in the war in Ukraine. The investigation also indicated that the video contained no evidence of tampering or editing.

Murder of Ukrainian POW 

In early March a video emerged showing the execution of an unarmed Ukrainian POW who is murdered after he says "Glory to Ukraine", while smoking a cigarette. The Russian officer in charge of the prisoner (off camera) shouts "Die Bitch!" and fires multiple rounds from a machine gun into him. The President of Ukraine's office called the execution a "brutal murder".

The murdered soldier has been hailed as a hero by the political scientist Sergej Sumlenny.

Looting 

Looting is a war crime under several treaties. Survivors of the Bucha Massacre, talking to Human Rights Watch (HRW) following the retreat of the Russian forces, described the treatment of people in the city during the occupation: Russian soldiers went door to door, questioning people and destroying their possessions. They also said that Russian soldiers looted the town, and took clothing, jewelry, electronics, kitchen appliances and vehicles of evacuees, the deceased, and those still in the city. Wall Street Journal journalist Yaroslav Trofimov reported hearing of Russian soldiers looting food and valuables during his visit to southern Ukraine. The Guardian journalists visiting Trostianets after a month-long Russian occupation found evidence of "systematic looting". Similarly, villagers in Berestyanka near Kyiv told ABC News that before the village returned to Ukrainian control, Russian soldiers looted clothes, household appliances and electronics from homes.

Videos have been posted on Telegram, reportedly showing Russian soldiers sending stolen Ukrainian goods home through courier services in Belarus. Items visible in videos included air conditioning units, alcohol, car batteries, and bags from Epicentr K stores. News aggregator Ukraine Alert posted video showing stolen goods found in an abandoned Russian armored personnel carrier, and an image reportedly showing a damaged Russian military truck carrying three washing machines. Intercepted telephone calls have also made mention of looting; a call by a Russian soldier released by the Security Service of Ukraine included the soldier telling his girlfriend: "I stole some cosmetics for you" to which the girlfriend responded "What Russian person doesn't steal anything?" The Russian company CDEK postal service stopped live streaming its CCTV in early April. CDEK live-streams video from its delivery offices as a courtesy to customers to show them how busy the offices are, before customers visit the branches. This live stream was used by Lithuania-based exiled Belarusian dissident Anton Motolko as evidence of looting. Some of the items came from the Chernobyl nuclear power plant and were radioactive or contaminated with radioactivity.

There were reports of bazaars set up by Russian forces in Belarus to trade in looted goods, such items as "washing machines and dishwashers, refrigerators, jewelry, cars, bicycles, motorcycles, dishes, carpets, works of art, children's toys, cosmetics". Russian soldiers sought payment in euros and US dollars, however, and due to currency restrictions this was difficult for locals.

Widespread claims of looting by Russian troops of cultural institutions were raised by Ukrainian officials with a majority of the accusations coming from the areas of Mariupol and Melitopol. Ukrainian officials claimed that Russian forces seized more than 2,000 artworks and Scythian gold from various museums and moved them into the Donbas region.

Genocide 

Several national parliaments, including those of Ukraine as well as Canada, Poland, Estonia, Latvia, Lithuania, Czech Republic, Ireland declared that the war crimes taking place in the invasion were genocide. Scholars of genocide, including Eugene Finkel, Timothy D. Snyder, Norman M. Naimark and Gregory Stanton, and legal experts  and Zakhar Tropin said that along with the acts required by the definition of genocide, there was genocidal intent, together establishing genocide. Human rights lawyer Juan E. Méndez stated on 4 March 2022 that the genocide claim was worth investigating, but should not be presumed; and genocide scholar Alexander Hinton stated on 13 April that Russian president Vladimir Putin's genocidal rhetoric would have to be linked to the war crimes in order to establish genocidal intent.

A report by 30 genocide and legal scholars concluded that the Russian state is guilty of inciting genocide in Ukraine, that it has committed acts prohibited by the Genocide Convention, that a serious risk of genocide being committed exists, and that this triggers the obligation of state parties to the convention to take action to prevent genocide.

National legal proceedings

Ukraine 
The Ukrainian foreign minister Dmytro Kuleba stated on 25 February that Russia was committing war crimes, and that the ministry and the Prosecutor General of Ukraine were collecting evidence on events including attacks on kindergartens and orphanages, which would be "immediately transfer[red]" to the ICC. On 30 March, Ukraine's chief prosecutor announced that she was building 2,500 war crimes cases against the Russian invasion. On 13 May the first war crimes trial began in Kyiv, of a Russian soldier who was ordered to shoot an unarmed civilian. The soldier, Vadim Shishimarin, soon pleaded guilty to this crime. Shortly after Shishimarin pleaded guilty, two other low-ranked Russian soldiers, Alexander Bobikin and Alexander Ivanov, were tried on war crimes charges for firing missiles at a residential tower block in Kharkiv. They also pleaded guilty.

Several international legal teams were formed to support the Ukrainian prosecutors.

 EU Joint Investigation Team
In the aftermath of the Bucha massacre, the EU established a Joint Investigation Team with Ukraine to investigate war crimes and crimes against humanity. Within the framework of the Joint Investigation Team, a pool of investigators and legal experts by Eurojust and Europol is made available for providing assistance to Ukrainian prosecutors. On 6 April 2022, United States Attorney General Merrick Garland announced that the U.S. Department of Justice was assisting Eurojust and Europol prosecutors with their investigation, and that the Justice and State Departments were also making efforts to support the Ukrainian prosecutor.

Task Force on Accountability for Crimes Committed in Ukraine

In late March 2022, the Task Force on Accountability for Crimes Committed in Ukraine, a pro bono international group of lawyers, was created to help Ukrainian prosecutors coordinate legal cases for war crimes and other crimes related to the 2022 Russian invasion of Ukraine.

Atrocity Crimes Advisory Group
On 25 May 2022, the EU, US, and the UK announced the creation of the Atrocity Crimes Advisory Group (ACA) to help coordinate their investigations and to support the War Crimes Units of the Office of the Prosecutor General of Ukraine (OPG).

Other countries 

Several states, including Estonia, Germany, Latvia, Lithuania, Norway, Poland, Slovakia, Spain, and Sweden, announced in March and April 2022 that they would conduct investigations of war crimes in the 2022 Russian invasion of Ukraine under the universal jurisdiction principle of international humanitarian law.

International legal proceedings 
International courts that have jurisdiction over cases originating from the Russian invasion of Ukraine include the International Criminal Court, the International Court of Justice and the European Court of Human Rights.

Because of the backload of cases in Ukrainian courts, which as of June 2022 have more than 15,000 pending cases, and the number of international bodies and foreign countries cooperating in the investigations of war crimes in Ukraine, there were calls to create a special hybrid court to centralize domestic and international efforts. In May, the idea of establishing a special international tribunal was formally endorsed by a group of members of the European Parliament. The establishment of a special tribunal within the framework of the United Nations could be hampered by Russia's position as a permanent member of the Security Council and by the difficulty of gathering the necessary two-thirds majority in the General Assembly.

International Criminal Court 

On 25 February 2022, ICC Prosecutor Karim Ahmad Khan stated that the ICC could "exercise its jurisdiction and investigate any act of genocide, crime against humanity or war crime committed within Ukraine." Khan stated on 28 February that he would launch a full ICC investigation and that he had requested his team to "explore all evidence preservation opportunities". He stated that it would be faster to officially open the investigation if an ICC member state referred the case for investigation. Lithuanian prime minister Ingrida Simonyte stated on the same day that Lithuania had requested that the ICC investigation be opened.

On 2 March 2022, 39 states had already referred the situation in Ukraine to the ICC Prosecutor, who could then open an investigation into past and present allegations of war crimes, crimes against humanity or genocide committed in Ukraine by any person from 21 November 2013 onwards. On 11 March two additional referrals were submitted to the ICC Prosecutor, and the Prosecutor declared that investigations would begin. The Prosecutor's office set up an online method for people with evidence to initiate contact with investigators, and a team of investigators, lawyers and other professionals was sent to Ukraine to begin collecting evidence.

Neither Ukraine nor Russia is parties to the Rome Statute, the legal basis of the ICC. The ICC has jurisdiction to investigate because Ukraine signed two declarations consenting to ICC jurisdiction over crimes committed in Ukraine from 21 November 2013 onwards. Articles 28(a) and 28(b) of the Rome Statute define the relation between command responsibility and superior responsibility of the chain of command structures of the armed forces involved.

As of 10 June, the ICC investigation had dispatched more than 40 investigators, the largest effort ever in ICC history, and there are calls to create a special court or international tribunal to handle the casework.

In mid-June, according to the Dutch General Intelligence and Security Service, an alleged GRU officer, who was a student of prominent genocide professor Eugene Finkel, attempted to gain entry into the Netherlands under an assumed identity. The purpose was to infiltrate the ICC via an internship, which would have given him to access and potentially influence the pending criminal war crimes case.

International Court of Justice 

On 27 February, Ukraine filed a petition with the International Court of Justice arguing that Russia violated the Genocide Convention using an unsubstantiated accusation of genocide in order to justify its aggression against Ukraine.

On 1 March, the ICJ officially called on Russia to "act in such a way" that would make it possible for a decision on provisional measures to become effective. Initial hearings in the case took place on 7 March 2022 at Peace Palace in The Hague, Netherlands—the seat of the court—to determine Ukraine's entitlement to provisional relief. The Russian delegation did not appear for these proceedings, but submitted a written statement.

On 16 March 2022, the court ruled 13–2 that Russia must "immediately suspend the military operations" it commenced on 24 February 2022 in Ukraine, with Vice-president Kirill Gevorgian of Russia and Judge Xue Hanqin of China dissenting. The court also unanimously called for "[b]oth Parties [to] refrain from any action which might aggravate or extend the dispute before the Court or make it more difficult to resolve.

Proposed specialised court for the crime of aggression

The Council of Europe called for the establishment of an international criminal tribunal to "investigate and prosecute the crime of aggression" committed by "the political and military leadership of the Russian Federation." Under the Council of Europe's proposal, the tribunal should be located in Strasbourg, "apply the definition of the crime of aggression" established in customary international law and "have the power to issue international arrest warrants and not be limited by State immunity or the immunity of heads of State and government and other State officials." Similarly, other international bodies such as the European Commission and the NATO Parliamentary Assembly, and several governments, including the Government of Ukraine, supported the establishment of a specialised court to try the crime of aggression. 

In November 2022 the NATO Parliamentary Assembly designated the Russian Federation as a terrorist organization and called upon the international community to "to take collective action towards the establishment of an international tribunal to prosecute the crime of aggression committed by Russia with its war against Ukraine." In November 2022 the European Commission said that the European Union would work to establish a specialised court to investigate and prosecute Russia for the crime of aggression.

Other international organisations

International Commission of Inquiry on Ukraine 

On 4 March 2022, the United Nations Human Rights Council voted 32 in favour versus two against and 13 abstentions to create the International Commission of Inquiry on Ukraine, an independent international committee of three human rights experts with a mandate to investigate violations of human rights and of international humanitarian law in the context of the 2022 Russian invasion of Ukraine. ON 23 September 2022, the Commission released their first public statement, confirming the violation of human rights by Russian forces, with instances of indiscriminate killing, sexual violence against children, and torture across dozens of locations in Ukraine. They claim that the use of explosive weapons with wide area effects in populated areas is a source of immense harm and suffering for civilians. There are detention of the victims as well as visible signs of executions on bodies. They documented cases in which children have been raped, tortured, and unlawfully confined. Children have also been killed and injured in indiscriminate attacks with explosive weapons

UN Human Rights Monitoring Mission in Ukraine 

The UN Human Rights Monitoring Mission in Ukraine (HRMMU), whose monitoring of human rights violations by all parties in Ukraine started in 2014, continued its monitoring during the 2022 Russian invasion, retaining 60 monitors in Ukraine. On 30 March 2022, HRMMU had recorded 24 "credible allegations" of Russian use of cluster munitions and 77 incidents of damage to medical facilities during the invasion. Michelle Bachelet stated, "The massive destruction of civilian objects and the high number of civilian casualties strongly indicate that the fundamental principles of distinction, proportionality and precaution have not been sufficiently adhered to."

Organization for Security and Co-operation in Europe 
A report released by the OSCE Office for Democratic Institutions and Human Rights (ODIHR) on 12 April 2022 stated that while a detailed assessment of most allegations had not been possible, the mission had found clear patterns of war crimes by the Russian forces. According to the OSCE Report, had the Russian army refrained from indiscriminate and disproportionate attacks, the number of civilians casualties would have remained much lower and fewer houses, hospitals, schools and cultural properties would have been damaged or destroyed. The Report denounced the violation of international humanitarian law on military occupation and the violation of international human rights law (right to life, prohibition of torture and other inhuman and degrading treatment and punishment) mostly in the areas under the direct or indirect control of Russia.

International reactions 

During House of Commons commentary in February 2022, British Prime Minister Boris Johnson stated that "anyone who sends a Russian into battle to kill innocent Ukrainians" could face charges. He remarked in addition, "Putin will stand condemned in the eyes of the world and of history."

On 16 March, U.S. President Joe Biden called Putin a war criminal. On 23 March, U.S. Secretary of State Antony Blinken announced that the United States formally declared that the Russian military had committed war crimes in Ukraine, stating, "based on information currently available, the US government assesses that members of Russia's forces have committed war crimes in Ukraine." A week later the US State Department issued a formal assessment that Russia has committed war crimes. On 12 April 2022, Biden described Russia's war crimes in Ukraine as constituting genocide. He added that Putin "is trying to wipe out the idea of being able to be Ukrainian".

On 3 April 2022, French Foreign Minister Jean-Yves Le Drian described abuses by Russian forces in Ukrainian towns, particularly Bucha, as possible war crimes. On 7 April, French President Emmanuel Macron said the killings in the Ukrainian town of Bucha were "very probably war crimes."

The United Nations General Assembly voted on 7 April 2022 to suspend Russia from the United Nations Human Rights Council over "gross and systematic violations and abuses of human rights".

See also 

 Accusations of genocide in Donbas
 Russia–Ukraine relations
 Russia under Vladimir Putin
 Russo-Ukrainian War
 Casualties of the Russo-Ukrainian War
 Russian war crimes#Ukraine
 Ukraine v. Russian Federation (2022)
 Use of white phosphorus bombs in the 2022 Russian invasion of Ukraine
 War in Donbas
 War crimes in Donbas

Notes

References

Further reading

External links 

 Guide to investigating war crimes at Global Investigative Journalism Network by investigative journalist Manisha Ganguly
 Contact websites for those providing evidence
 Contact pathway of the Office of the Prosecutor of the International Criminal Court
 Ukrainian government website  for collecting evidence on war crimes committed by Russian forces
 Map of likely war crimes in Ukraine by Bellingcat
 War Crimes Watch Ukraine, a collaboration between the Associated Press and Frontline
UN investigator outlines evidence of Russian war crimes in liberated areas of Ukraine, from PBS NewsHour (2022-09-28)
 Videos
 Video of drone flyover of apartment buildings being bombed in Mariupol. News.com.au, The News Room, 15 March 2022
 Video of tanks firing repeatedly on apartment buildings in Mariupol, civilians in hospital, woman crying for dead children. AP News, 12 March 2022
 Video of aftermath, including injured pregnant woman being carried, after Russian airstrike on hospital in Mariupol, Ukraine. Sky News, 9 March 2022
 CBS News video about pattern of rape by Russian soldiers against Ukrainian women during the invasion

Anti-Ukrainian sentiment
Articles containing video clips
Russian war crimes in Ukraine
 
War crimes in Ukraine
Ukrainian war crimes
2022 crimes in Ukraine
State-sponsored terrorism